Gopiballavpur Assembly constituency is an assembly constituency in Jhargram district in the Indian state of West Bengal.

Overview
As per orders of the Delimitation Commission, No. 221 Gopiballavpur Assembly constituency is composed of the following: Beliabera, Kharbandhi, Pet Bindhi and Tapshia gram panchayats of Gopiballavpur II community development block, Aguiboni, Chandri, Chubka, Dudhkundi, Lodhasuli, Nedabahara, Patashimul, Shalboni and Sardiha gram panchayats of Jhargram CD Block and Sankrail CD Block.

Gopiballavpur Assembly constituency is part of No. 33 Jhargram (Lok Sabha constituency) (ST).

Election results

2021

2016

2011

 
 

# Swing calculated on Congress+Trinamool Congress vote percentages taken together in 2006.

1977-2006
In the 2006 state assembly elections, Rabi Lal Maitra of CPI(M) won the Gopiballavpur assembly seat defeating his nearest rival Swapan Patra of Trinamool Congress. Contests in most years were multi cornered but only winners and runners are being mentioned. Bhabani Shankar Hatial of CPI(M) defeated Samay Mandi of Trinamool Congress in 2001. Rana Shakti of CPI(M) defeated Rekha Rani Mahata of Congress in 1996. Atul Chandra Das of CPI(M) defeated Prasun Sarangi of Congress in 1991. Sunil De of CPI(M) defeated Bijoy Kumar Sahu of Congress in 1987 and Santosh Rana, Independent, in 1982. Santosh Rana, Independent, defeated Abani Bhusan Satpathi of CPI(M) in 1977.

1951-1972
Harish Mahapatra of Congress won in 1972 and 1971. Dhananjoy Kar of SSP won in 1969 and 1967. Surendra Nath Mahta of Congress won in 1962. In 1957 and 1951 Gopiballavpur had dual seats. Surndranath Mahta and Jagatpati Hansda, both of Congress, won in 1957. Dhanajoy Kar and Jagatpati Hansda, both of KMPP, won in independent India's first election in 1951.

References

Assembly constituencies of West Bengal
Politics of Jhargram district